Gregory Fitzpatrick Richardson (born 16 June 1982) is a Guyanese professional footballer who plays as a striker for GFF Elite League club Fruta Conquerors and the Guyana national team.

Career

Caribbean
Richardson formerly played for Georgetown FC and Camptown Georgetown in his home country, and for Joe Public from Trinidad and Tobago. While playing for Joe Public in the CONCACAF Champions League 2008–09 Preliminary Round he scored a hat-trick, helping his team eliminate New England Revolution, and bringing himself to international attention.

United States
Richardson signed for Colorado Rapids in early 2009, and made his MLS debut on 21 March 2009, Colorado's first game of the 2009 MLS season against Chivas USA.

He was waived by Colorado on 27 June 2009, only making one appearance for the club. After a successful trial with the Carolina RailHawks the club announced the signing of Richardson on 9 July 2009. He became an instant impact where he was able to register his first hat trick in a 4–0 victory over Miami FC. He scored the fastest goal in club history against Puerto Rico Islanders at the second minute. He finished off the season as tied in first for most assists with five, and was the second highest goal scorer with six goals. He helped his Carolina side clinch a playoff spot by finishing second in the regular season standings. On 5 February 2010 Carolina re-signed Richardson to a one-year deal with a club option for 2011.

Richardson was not listed on the 2011 roster for Carolina released on 4 April 2011. He was later signed by the Puerto Rico Islanders on 15 April.

After the Islanders went on hiatus he returned to Guyana to play for Alpha United, helping them reach the 2014-15 CONCACAF Champions League.

International goals
Scores and results list Guyana's goal tally first.

Note: Some sources have credited Richardson with scoring the first goal in a 5–0 victory over Netherlands Antilles in 2006, however this was actually scored by Nigel Codrington.

References

External links
Carolina RailHawks bio
Caribbean Football Database

1982 births
Living people
Puerto Rico Islanders players
North Carolina FC players
Colorado Rapids players
Guyanese footballers
Guyana international footballers
Expatriate footballers in Barbados
Notre Dame SC players
Expatriate footballers in Trinidad and Tobago
Guyanese expatriate sportspeople in Trinidad and Tobago
TT Pro League players
Joe Public F.C. players
Expatriate soccer players in the United States
Major League Soccer players
USL First Division players
Expatriate footballers in Puerto Rico
USSF Division 2 Professional League players
North American Soccer League players
Alpha United FC players
Association football forwards
Pele FC players
Fruta Conquerors FC players
Georgetown FC players